The Franklin Range is a small mountain range on Vancouver Island, British Columbia, Canada, located just southwest of Robson Bight and Johnstone Strait. It has an area of 200 km2 and is a subrange of the Vancouver Island Ranges which in turn form part of the Insular Mountains. The range was named in 1861 by Captain Richards for noted Arctic explorer Rear Admiral Sir John Franklin who died exploring the Arctic and his wife, Lady Franklin.  The Cracroft Islands across Johnstone Strait were named for Sophia Cracroft, Sir John's niece who accompanied Lady Franklin on her journey around the world that brought them to British Columbia during the Fraser Gold Rush of 1858.

See also
List of mountain ranges

References

External links

Vancouver Island Ranges
Mountain ranges of British Columbia